During the 2001–02 English football season, Brighton & Hove Albion F.C. competed in the Football League Second Division.

Season summary
In October 2001, Brighton boss Adams left the club to work as Dave Bassett's assistant at Leicester City, being replaced by former Leicester manager Peter Taylor. The transition proved to be a plus point for Brighton, who maintained their good form and ended the season as Division Two champions – winning a second successive promotion.

Final league table

Results
Brighton & Hove Albion's score comes first

Legend

Football League Second Division

FA Cup

League Cup

LDV Vans Trophy

Players

First-team squad
Squad at end of season

Left club during season

References

Brighton & Hove Albion F.C. seasons
Brighton and Hove Albion